Camp Butner was a United States Army installation in Butner, North Carolina during World War II. It was named after Army general and North Carolina native Henry W. Butner. Part of it was used as a POW camp for German prisoners of war in the United States and this site eventually became the Federal Correctional Complex, Butner. The camp site was chosen in the late summer of 1941 to have a major training area, built with construction starting in January 1942. In just 6 short months, over 1,700 buildings were constructed. There were enough beds in the enlisted barracks alone to accommodate over 35,000 soldiers.

Several major US Army divisions used the camp as a staging area during the war, to assemble and organize prior to being deployed to both the European and Pacific theaters. Divisions like the 35th Infantry Division, 78th Infantry Division, and 89th Infantry Division came to Camp Butner prior to heading to Europe.

After the war, the camp was used as a major facility for the demobilization and inactivation of Army units returning from combat. Among the units inactivated at the camp were the 3d Infantry Regiment and the 4th Infantry Division.

The Camp was also the location of the Battalion Surgeon's Assistant school and had a convalescent hospital for wounded troops that operated much like Walter Reed does today.

Today

Camp Butner Training Center is currently under North Carolina Army National Guard ownership. Since 2005 it has played host to the Civilian Marksmanship Program's Eastern Junior Highpower Clinic & Championship, taught by the United States Marine Corps Mobile Marksmanship Unit. Its 1000-yard range, designated Range 4, is frequently host to a variety of shooting matches, including those sponsored by the Civilian Marksmanship Program (CMP), and the National Rifle Association (NRA). The CMP's Eastern Games and Creedmoor Cup are held annually at Camp Butner, lasting two weeks.

A museum dedicated to the soldiers, civilians and prisoners of war who called the camp home from 1942–1946, operated by the 501c3 nonprofit Camp Butner Society, is currently housed in the sports arena on 24th Street that was built with the rest of the camp in 1942. The Society has the last remaining wooden structure of its type original to Camp Butner that will eventually house the museum but will require extensive funding and restoration before that can occur.

References

External links
 Camp Butner Society

Military installations in North Carolina
World War II prisoner of war camps in the United States
United States home front during World War II
Buildings and structures in Granville County, North Carolina
1942 establishments in North Carolina
1946 disestablishments in North Carolina